Aneta Udriștioiu (née Pîrvuț; born 22 June 1989) is a Romanian handball player for Dunărea Brăila and the Romanian national team.

International honours 
EHF Champions League:
Bronze Medalist: 2018
Youth European Championship:
Silver Medalist: 2005
Youth World Championship:
Bronze Medalist: 2006
Junior European Championship:
Bronze Medalist: 2007

References

External links

 

1989 births
Living people
People from Drobeta-Turnu Severin
Romanian female handball players
CS Minaur Baia Mare (women's handball) players